Liam O'Donovan may refer to:
 Liam O'Donovan (Gaelic footballer)
 Liam O'Donovan (Tracy Beaker Returns)